Outro Olhar (English: From Another Perspective) is a memoir by Brazilian writer Sophia Mendonça. Originally released on November 19, 2015, the book brings together essays and reflections on the author's childhood and adolescence. In this way, it addresses topics such as the daily life of an autistic young woman, Nichiren's Buddhism and Inclusive Education.

Book's overview 
In Outro Olhar, Sophia Mendonça argues that is dangerous to assume that autistic people are geniuses. For her, the great pleasure for autistic people is to master things that do not represent any obstacles for others, so, the autistic world has its differentiated beauty, but this world also has a dark side that makes who faces it true warriors. The book also onveys the idea that obstacles can be overcome, as the family's love and social affection are the panacea for the world to which we all belong.

Sophia Mendonça wrote the book in six months, in the first half of 2015. According to the author said in an interview on the occasion of its launch, it was enough time to observe her daily life, remember facts from the past and understand how autism causes that even banal situations are so different for her. She also dedicated herself, during this period, to studying buddhist philosophy, which has a lot of influence on the book.

Reception 
Published by Manduruvá Edições Especiais, Outro Olhar's first edition sold out two days after its release. In 2020, a US version was released by RM Books, titled From Another Perspective.

The portuguese writer Rita Nolasco defined the book as accessible and easy to identify. She praised the book's tender and fun tone for featuring an 18-year-old girl advising more experienced adults. Nolasco concluded that this was an intense and authentic book.

The nrazilian writer and television host Eduardo Machado reinforced the importance of the book for teachers. Thus, he argued that the book is an invitation to overcome beliefs fueled by common sense, especially in relation to mental disorder.

According to BusinessMan and philanthropist Leonardo Gontijo, Outro Olhar demystifies false beliefs about the syndrome, highlights the complexity of interpersonal relationships and brings its perspective against invisibility. 

Cultural journalist Eleomara Duarte said that the author was skillful in acting as a reporter for herself. For Duarte, this is a revealing and engaging book.

References 

Brazilian books
Memoirs
Autism
Brazilian non-fiction books
Brazilian non-fiction literature
Books about autism
Brazilian memoirs
2015 books
2010s books
Books by Sophia Mendonça